Czarniecki (feminine: Czarniecka; plural: Czarnieccy) is a surname of Polish language origin. A variant of Czarnecki, it is a toponymic surname for someone from Czarnca in Kielce voivodeship, or any of the various places called Czarnocin or Czarnia, all derived from the Polish adjective "czarny", which means 'black'.
The surname may refer to:
 House of Czarniecki
 Stefan Czarniecki (1599–1665), Polish military commander
 Jan Czarniecki, miecznik of Krakow 
 Paweł Czarniecki (died 1664), rotmistrz
 Jan Czarniecki, bishop of Kamieniec Podolski in 1677, Czerwinsk prior
 Feliks Czarniecki (1871–1959), psychiatrist

See also
 
 Czarnecki

References
 

Polish-language surnames
Jewish surnames

pl:Czarniecki